The Kemist, is a Jamaican-American deejay, producer, recording artist and songwriter signed to Universal Music Group. His sound is a fusion of reggae and dancehall with electronic dance music.

Early life 

Errol "Kemar" Thompson, professionally known as The Kemist, was born and raised in Kingston, Jamaica. His mother, Marcia Griffiths , is considered the Queen of reggae music  and his father, Errol Thompson Snr, is an acclaimed Jamaican broadcaster, social speaker and musician.

Kemar attended Wolmer's Boy's High School where he participated in rap battles during lunchtime and from there started making beats and selling tracks to friends.

In 2012, Kemar and Mike Thompson formed the production duo Black Lion, whose credits include Mash It Up, Slippery When Wet and I Love Sax.

Career 

The Kemist's first release as a vocalist was Assets, a collaboration with Yellow Claw and Tropkillaz that was released on Diplo's label, Mad Decent on 12 October 2013.

In 2018 The Kemist signed with Universal Music Group. On 2 November 2018 they released his first single Body Can't Lie featuring Nyanda via 21 Entertainment / Republic Records / Universal Music Canada.

Discography

Albums & EPs

Singles

As lead artist

As featured artist

As Composer / Writer

As remixer

Non-Singles

As lead artist

As Featured Artist

As Composer / Writer

Music videos

References

External links
 

Jamaican rappers
Jamaican people of English descent
Reggae fusion artists
Ragga musicians
Jamaican reggae singers
Jamaican male singers
Dancehall musicians
Musicians from Kingston, Jamaica
American male singer-songwriters
21st-century American singers
Singer-songwriters from Florida
Jamaican musicians
Jamaican DJs
Record production teams
Living people
21st-century American male singers
Year of birth missing (living people)